Ben Fielding is an Australian contemporary Christian music and worship songwriter, and one of several worship leaders in Hillsong Worship group. He has written many songs for the group, winning three Dove Awards and one Grammy Award.

Fielding and Reuben Morgan wrote the song "Mighty to Save". It won the Worship Song of the Year at the 40th GMA Dove Awards (it was also nominated in the Song of the Year category).

"What a Beautiful Name", a song he co-wrote with Brooke Ligertwood, won the 2018 Grammy award for Best Contemporary Christian Music Performance/Song, and won the Song of the Year award at the 2017 Dove Awards.

"Who You Say I Am", written with Morgan, won the 2019 Dove Award for Worship Song of the Year.

References 

Living people
Hillsong musicians
Grammy Award winners
Year of birth missing (living people)